Ralph Radyn DD (a.k.a. Radulph Radyn) was an English medieval theologian and university chancellor.

Radyn  achieved a Doctor of Divinity degree. Between 1332 and 1334, he was Chancellor of Oxford University.

References

Year of birth unknown
Year of death unknown
English theologians
Chancellors of the University of Oxford
14th-century English people